The Fort Leavenworth Lamp is a weekly newspaper for the U.S. Army military community living in Fort Leavenworth, Kansas. It is a civilian contract newspaper, printed by GateHouseMedia, Inc., and has a circulation varying between 8,000 to 10,000. It serves as a record for activities on Fort Leavenworth, including the history of the U.S. Army Command and General Staff College and the U.S. Disciplinary Barracks located on the Army post.

The Fort Leavenworth Lamp newspaper targets military members, family members, Army civilian employees and military retirees as its audience. News coverage is limited to Fort Leavenworth events and activities. Rules and regulations of the Department of Defense, the Army and Installation Management Command limit what can be published.  For example, the Lamp rejects photographs that contain military uniform violations.

Advertising 
Advertising of The Fort Leavenworth Lamp is handled through GateHouse Media, located at 422 Seneca Street in Leavenworth, Kansas. It is a member newspaper of the Kansas Press Association.

History 
The Fort Leavenworth Lamp entered its 40th year of production on April 8, 2011. The paper was named by Lt. Col. Robert Simpson, a U.S. Army Command and General Staff College instructor, who named the newspaper after the Fort Leavenworth Lamp insignia chosen as the symbol of the Command and General Staff College in 1956.

In 1991, the Lamp was renamed "The Fort Leavenworth Lamp" to avoid trademark infringement with "The Lamp," a publication of the Exxon oil company.

References

External links 
 Gatehousemedia.com

Newspapers published in Kansas
Military newspapers published in the United States
Newspapers established in 1971
Fort Leavenworth
1971 establishments in Kansas